The Life and Death of King Richard the Second, commonly called Richard II, is a history play by William Shakespeare believed to have been written around 1595. It is based on the life of King Richard II of England (ruled 1377–1399) and chronicles his downfall and the machinations of his nobles. It is the first part of a tetralogy, referred to by some scholars as the Henriad, followed by three plays about Richard's successors: Henry IV, Part 1; Henry IV, Part 2; and Henry V.

Although the First Folio (1623) includes the play among the histories, the earlier Quarto edition of 1597 calls it The tragedie of King Richard the second.

Characters

 King Richard II
 John of Gaunt, Duke of Lancaster – Richard's uncle
 Duke of York – Richard's uncle
 Duke of Aumerle – York's son
 Thomas Mowbray, Duke of Norfolk
 Queen – Richard's wife (an unnamed composite of his first wife, Anne of Bohemia, and his second, Isabella of Valois, who was still a child at the time of his death)
 Duchess of York – York's wife (an unnamed composite of York's first wife, Isabella of Castile, and his second, Joan Holland)
 Duchess of Gloucester – widow of Thomas of Woodstock, Duke of Gloucester, uncle to the king

Rebels
 Henry Bolingbroke – Duke of Hereford, son of John of Gaunt, later Henry IV
 Earl of Northumberland
 Henry 'Hotspur' Percy – Northumberland's son
 Lord Ross
 Lord Willoughby
 Lord Fitzwater
 Sir Piers Exton

Richard's allies
 Duke of Surrey
 Earl of Salisbury
 Lord Berkeley
 Bushy – favourite of Richard
 Bagot – favourite of Richard
 Green – favourite of Richard
 Bishop of Carlisle
 Abbot of Westminster
 Sir Stephen Scroop
 Earl of Witshire - an off-stage character referred to as "Earl of Wiltshire."

Others
 Lord Marshal (post held in 1399 by Duke of Surrey, though this is not recognised in the play)
 Welsh captain
 Two heralds
 Gardener
 Gardener's man
 Queen's ladies
 Keeper – jailer at Pomfret prison
 Groom
 Attendants, lords, soldiers, messengers, etc.

Synopsis
The play spans only the last two years of Richard's life, from 1398 to 1400. It begins with King Richard sitting majestically on his throne in full state, having been requested to arbitrate a dispute between Thomas Mowbray and Richard's cousin, Henry Bolingbroke, later Henry IV, who has accused Mowbray of squandering money given to him by Richard for the king's soldiers and of murdering Bolingbroke's uncle, the Duke of Gloucester. Bolingbroke's father, John of Gaunt, 1st Duke of Lancaster, meanwhile, believes it was Richard himself who was responsible for his brother's murder. After several attempts to calm both men, Richard acquiesces and it is determined that the matter be resolved in the established method of trial by battle between Bolingbroke and Mowbray, despite the objections of Gaunt.The tournament scene is very formal with a long, ceremonial introduction, but as the combatants are about to fight, Richard interrupts and sentences both to banishment from England. Bolingbroke is originally sentenced to ten years' banishment, but Richard reduces this to six years upon seeing John of Gaunt's grieving face, while Mowbray is banished permanently. The king's decision can be seen as the first mistake in a series leading eventually to his overthrow and death, since it is an error which highlights many of his character flaws, displaying as it does indecisiveness (in terms of whether to allow the duel to go ahead), abruptness (Richard waits until the last possible moment to cancel the duel), and arbitrariness (there is no apparent reason why Bolingbroke should be allowed to return and Mowbray not). In addition, the decision fails to dispel the suspicions surrounding Richard's involvement in the death of the Duke of Gloucester – in fact, by handling the situation so high-handedly and offering no coherent explanation for his reasoning, Richard only manages to appear more guilty. Mowbray predicts that the king will sooner or later fall at the hands of Bolingbroke.

After an impassioned invective against the visiting king from his sick-bed, John of Gaunt dies and Richard seizes all of his land and money. This angers the nobility, who accuse Richard of wasting England's money, of taking Gaunt's money (belonging by rights to his son, Bolingbroke) to fund war in Ireland, of taxing the commoners, and of fining the nobles for crimes committed by their ancestors. They then help Bolingbroke to return secretly to England, with a plan to overthrow Richard. There remain, however, subjects who continue to be faithful to the king, among them Bushy, Bagot, Green and the Duke of Aumerle (son of the Duke of York), cousin of both Richard and Bolingbroke. When King Richard leaves England to attend to the war in Ireland, Bolingbroke seizes the opportunity to assemble an army and invades the north coast of England.  Executing both Bushy and Green, Bolingbroke wins over the Duke of York, whom Richard has left in charge of his government in his absence.

Upon Richard's return, Bolingbroke not only reclaims his lands but lays claim to the very throne. After a dramatic public ceremony where he has the captive king publicly renounce his crown, he crowns himself King Henry IV, and has Richard taken prisoner to the castle of Pomfret. Aumerle and others plan a rebellion against the new king, but York discovers his son's treachery and reveals it to Henry, who spares Aumerle as a result of the intercession of the Duchess of York while executing the other conspirators.  After interpreting King Henry's "living fear" as a reference to the still-living Richard, an ambitious nobleman (Exton) goes to the prison and murders him. King Henry repudiates the murderer and vows to journey to Jerusalem to cleanse himself of his part in Richard's death.

Sources

Shakespeare's primary source for Richard II, as for most of his chronicle histories, was Raphael Holinshed's Chronicles of England, Scotlande, and Irelande; the publication of the second edition in 1587 provides a terminus post quem for the play. Edward Hall's The Union of the Two Illustrious Families of Lancaster and York appears also to have been consulted, and scholars have also supposed Shakespeare familiar with Samuel Daniel's poem on the civil wars.

A somewhat more complicated case is presented by the anonymous play sometimes known as The First Part of Richard II. This play, which exists in one incomplete manuscript copy (at the British Museum) is subtitled Thomas of Woodstock, and it is by this name that scholars since F. S. Boas have usually called it. This play treats the events leading up to the start of Shakespeare's play (though the two texts do not have identical characters). This closeness, along with the anonymity of the manuscript, has led certain scholars to attribute all or part of the play to Shakespeare, though many critics view this play as a secondary influence on Shakespeare, not as his work.

Date and text

The earliest recorded performance of Richard II was a private one, in Canon Row, the house of Edward Hoby, on 9 December 1595. The play was entered into the Register of the Stationers Company on 29 August 1597 by the bookseller Andrew Wise; the first quarto was published by him later that year, printed by Valentine Simmes. The second and third quartos followed in 1598 – the only time a Shakespeare play was printed in three editions in two years. Q4 followed in 1608, and Q5 in 1615. The play was next published in the First Folio in 1623.

Richard II exists in a number of variations. The quartos vary to some degree from one another, and the folio presents further differences. The first three quartos (printed in 1597 and 1598, commonly assumed to have been prepared from Shakespeare's holograph) lack the deposition scene. The fourth quarto, published in 1608, includes a version of the deposition scene shorter than the one later printed, presumably from a prompt-book, in the 1623 First Folio. The scant evidence makes explaining these differences largely conjectural. Traditionally, it has been supposed that the quartos lack the deposition scene because of censorship, either from the playhouse or by the Master of the Revels Edmund Tylney and that the Folio version may better reflect Shakespeare's original intentions. There is no external evidence for this hypothesis, however, and the title page of the 1608 quarto refers to a "lately acted" deposition scene (although, again, this could be due to earlier censorship which was later relaxed).

Analysis and criticism

Structure and language
The play is divided into five acts and its structure is as formal as its language. It has a double complementary plot describing the fall of Richard II and the rise of Bolingbroke, later known as Henry IV. Critic John R. Elliott Jr. notes that this particular history play can be distinguished from the other history plays because it contains an ulterior political purpose. The normal structure of Shakespearean tragedy is modified to portray a central political theme: the rise of Bolingbroke to the throne and the conflict between Richard and Bolingbroke over the kingship. In Acts IV and V, Shakespeare includes incidents irrelevant to the fate of Richard that are later resolved in the future plays of the Richard II–Henry V tetralogy.

The literary critic Hugh M. Richmond notes that Richard's beliefs about the Divine Right of Kings tend to fall more in line with the medieval view of the throne. Bolingbroke, on the other hand, represents a more modern view of the throne by arguing that not only bloodline but also intellect and political savvy contribute to the makings of a good king. Richard believes that as king he is chosen and guided by God, he is not subject to human frailty and the English people are his to do with as he pleases. Elliott argues that mistaken notion of his role as king is what ultimately leads to Richard's failure. Elliott goes on further and points out that it is Bolingbroke's ability to relate and speak with those of the middle and lower classes that allows him to take the throne.

Unusually for Shakespeare, Richard II is written entirely in verse, and one of only four of his plays that are, the others being King John and the first and third parts of Henry VI.  It thus contains no prose. There are also great differences in the use of language amongst the characters. Traditionally, Shakespeare uses prose to distinguish social classes: the upper classes generally speak in poetry while the lower classes speak in prose. In Richard II, there is no prose, but Richard uses flowery, metaphorical language in his speeches, whereas Bolingbroke, who is also of the noble class, uses a more plain and direct language. In Richard II, besides the usual blank verse (unrhymed pentameters), there are long stretches of heroic couplets (pairs of rhymed pentameters). The play contains a number of memorable metaphors, including the extended comparison of England with a garden in Act III, Scene iv and of its reigning king to a lion or to the sun in Act IV.

The language of Richard II is more eloquent than that of the earlier history plays, and serves to set the tone and themes of the play. Shakespeare uses lengthy verses, metaphors, similes and soliloquies to reflect Richard's character as a man who likes to analyse situations rather than act upon them. He always speaks in tropes using analogies such as the sun as a symbol of his kingly status. Richard places great emphasis on symbols which govern his behaviour. His crown serves as a symbol of his royal power and is of more concern to him than his actual kingly duties.

Historical context

The play was performed and published late in the reign of Elizabeth I of England, at a time when the queen's advanced age made the succession an important political concern. The historical parallels in the succession of Richard II may not have been intended as political comment on the contemporary situation, with the weak Richard II analogous to Queen Elizabeth and an implicit argument in favour of her replacement by a monarch capable of creating a stable dynasty, but lawyers investigating John Hayward's historical work, The First Part of the Life and Raigne of King Henrie IV, a book previously believed to have taken from Shakespeare's Richard II, chose to make this connection. Samuel Schoenbaum contests that Hayward had written his work prior to Richard II, joking that "there is nothing like a hypothetical manuscript to resolve an awkwardness of chronology", as Hayward noted he had written the work several years before its publication. Hayward had dedicated his version to Robert Devereux, 2nd Earl of Essex and when Essex was arrested for rebellion in February 1601 Hayward had already been imprisoned, to strengthen the case against the earl for "incitement to the deposing of the Queen". That Hayward had made his dedication was fortunate for Shakespeare, otherwise he too might have lost his liberty over the affair.

Shakespeare's play appears to have played a minor role in the events surrounding the final downfall of Essex. On 7 February 1601, just before the uprising, supporters of the Earl of Essex, among them Charles and Joscelyn Percy (younger brothers of the Earl of Northumberland), paid for a performance at the Globe Theatre on the eve of their armed rebellion. By this agreement, reported at the trial of Essex by the Chamberlain's Men actor Augustine Phillips, the conspirators paid the company forty shillings "above the ordinary" (i.e., above their usual rate) to stage this play, which the players felt was too old and "out of use" to attract a large audience. Eleven of Essex's supporters attended the Saturday performance.

Elizabeth was aware of the political ramifications of the story of Richard II: according to a well-known but dubious anecdote, in August 1601 she was reviewing historical documents relating to the reign of Richard II when she supposedly remarked to her archivist William Lambarde, "I am Richard II, know ye not that?" In the same historical report the Queen is said to have complained that the play was performed forty times in "open streets and houses" but there is no extant evidence to corroborate this tale. At any rate, the Chamberlain's Men do not appear to have suffered for their association with the Essex group; but they were commanded to perform it for the Queen on Shrove Tuesday in 1601, the day before Essex's execution.

Themes and motifs

The King's Two Bodies
In his analysis of medieval political theology, The King’s Two Bodies, Ernst Kantorowicz describes medieval kings as containing two bodies: a body natural, and a body politic. The theme of the king's two bodies is pertinent throughout Richard II, from the exile of Bolingbroke to the deposition of King Richard II. The body natural is a mortal body, subject to all the weaknesses of mortal human beings. On the other hand, the body politic is a spiritual body which cannot be affected by mortal infirmities such as disease and old age. These two bodies form one indivisible unit, with the body politic superior to the body natural.

Many critics agree that in Richard II, this central theme of the king's two bodies unfolds in three main scenes: the scenes at the Coast of Wales, at Flint Castle, and at Westminster. At the coast of Wales, Richard has just returned from a trip to Ireland and kisses the soil of England, demonstrating his kingly attachment to his kingdom. This image of kingship gradually fades as Bolingbroke's rebellion continues. Richard starts to forget his kingly nature as his mind becomes occupied by the rebellion. This change is portrayed in the scene at Flint Castle during which the unity of the two bodies disintegrates and the king starts to use more poetic and symbolic language. Richard's body politic has been shaken as his followers have joined Bolingbroke's army, diminishing Richard's military capacity. He has been forced to give up his jewels, losing his kingly appearance. He loses his temper at Bolingbroke, but then regains his composure as he starts to remember his divine side. At Flint Castle, Richard is determined to hang onto his kingship even though the title no longer fits his appearance. However at Westminster the image of the divine kingship is supported by the Bishop of Carlisle rather than Richard, who at this point is becoming mentally unstable as his authority slips away. Biblical references are used to liken the humbled king to the humbled Christ. The names of Judas and Pilate are used to further extend this comparison. Before Richard is sent to his death, he "un-kings" himself by giving away his crown, sceptre, and the balm that is used to anoint a king to the throne. The mirror scene is the final end to the dual personality. After examining his plain physical appearance, Richard shatters the mirror on the ground and thus relinquishes his past and present as king. Stripped of his former glory, Richard finally releases his body politic and retires to his body natural and his own inner thoughts and griefs. Critic J. Dover Wilson notes that Richard's double nature as man and martyr is the dilemma that runs through the play eventually leading to Richard's death. Richard acts the part of a royal martyr, and due to the spilling of his blood, England continually undergoes civil war for the next two generations.

The rise of a Machiavellian king
The play ends with the rise of Bolingbroke to the throne, marking the start of a new era in England. According to historical research, an English translation of Machiavelli's The Prince might have existed as early as 1585, influencing the reigns of the kings of England. Critic Irving Ribner notes that a manifestation of Machiavellian philosophy may be seen in Bolingbroke. Machiavelli wrote The Prince during a time of political chaos in Italy, and writes down a formula by which a leader can lead the country out of turmoil and return it to prosperity. Bolingbroke seems to be a leader coming into power at a time England is in turmoil, and follows closely the formula stated by Machiavelli. At the start of Richard II Bolingbroke accuses Mowbray and ulteriorly attacks the government of King Richard. He keeps Northumberland by his side as a tool to control certain constituents. From the minute Bolingbroke comes into power, he destroys the faithful supporters of Richard such as Bushy, Green and the Earl of Wiltshire. Also, Bolingbroke is highly concerned with the maintenance of legality to the kingdom, an important principle of Machiavellian philosophy, and therefore makes Richard surrender his crown and physical accessories to erase any doubt as to the real heir to the throne. Yet, Irving Ribner still notes a few incidents where Bolingbroke does not follow true Machiavellian philosophy, such as his failure to destroy Aumerle, but such incidents are minuscule compared to the bigger events of the play. Even Bolingbroke's last statement follows Machiavellian philosophy as he alludes to making a voyage to the Holy Land, since Machiavellian philosophy states rulers must appear pious. Therefore, this particular play can be viewed as a turning point in the history of England as the throne is taken over by a more commanding king in comparison to King Richard II.

Performance history
On 9 December 1595, Sir Robert Cecil enjoyed "K. Richard" at Sir Edward Hoby's house in Canon Row, and it might have been Shakespeare's Richard II, although some suspected that it was a different play, a painting, or a historical document.

Another commissioned performance of a different type occurred at the Globe Theatre on 7 Feb. 1601. This was the performance paid for by supporters of the Earl of Essex's planned revolt (see Historical Context above).

It is said that on 30 September 1607, the crew of Capt. William Keeling acted Richard II aboard the British East India Company ship The Red Dragon, off Sierra Leone, but the authenticity of this record is doubted.

The play was performed at the Globe on 12 June 1631.

The play retained its political charge in the Restoration: a 1680 adaptation at Drury Lane by Nahum Tate was suppressed for its perceived political implications. Tate attempted to mask his version, called The Sicilian Usurper, with a foreign setting; he attempted to blunt his criticism of the Stuart court by highlighting Richard's noble qualities and downplaying his weaknesses. Neither expedient prevented the play from being "silenc'd on the third day," as Tate wrote in his preface. Lewis Theobald staged a successful and less troubled adaptation in 1719 at Lincoln's Inn Fields; Shakespeare's original version was revived at Covent Garden in 1738.

The play had limited popularity in the early twentieth century, but John Gielgud exploded onto the world's theatrical consciousness, through his performance as Richard at the Old Vic Theatre in 1929, returning to the character in 1937 and 1953 in what ultimately was considered as the definitive performance of the role. Another legendary Richard was Maurice Evans, who first played the role at the Old Vic in 1934 and then created a sensation in his 1937 Broadway performance, revived it in New York in 1940 and then immortalised it on television for the Hallmark Hall of Fame in 1954. In England, Paul Scofield, who played it at the Old Vic in 1952, was considered the definitive Richard of more modern times. In the 1968–1970 seasons of the Prospect Theatre Company, Ian McKellen made a breakthrough performance as Richard, opposite Timothy West as Bolingbroke. The production, directed by Richard Cottrell, toured Britain and Europe, featuring in the Edinburgh Festival in 1969 and on BBC TV in 1970. In 1974, Ian Richardson and Richard Pasco alternated the roles of Richard and Bolingbroke in a production from John Barton at the Royal Shakespeare Theatre: nearly fifty years later this was still a standard by which performances were being judged. One of the most accessible versions was the 1978 television production by the BBC of the play, shown as part of "The Shakespeare Plays" (a several years-long project to put all of Shakespeare's plays on tape). This version, still available on DVD, starred Derek Jacobi as Richard, with John Gielgud making an appearance as John of Gaunt. In 1997, Fiona Shaw played the role as a man. More recently, the play was staged by Trevor Nunn in modern costume at the Old Vic in 2005, with Kevin Spacey in the title role, and by Michael Grandage at the Donmar Warehouse in 2011–12 with Eddie Redmayne in the title role.

Additionally the role was played by Mark Rylance at the Globe Theatre in 2003. An often overlooked production, the lead actor handles the character in, as The Guardian noted, perhaps the most vulnerable way ever seen. The play returned to the Globe in 2015 with Charles Edwards in the title role.

In summer 2012, BBC Two broadcast a filmed adaptation together with other plays in the Henriad under the series title The Hollow Crown with Ben Whishaw as Richard II.

No film version for cinema release has ever been made; however, the 1949 film Train of Events includes a sub-plot featuring an amateur dramatics society performing the last scenes of Richard II.

The Royal Shakespeare Company produced the play with David Tennant in the lead role in 2013. It has been released as a Cineplex Odeon special worldwide movie event. Tennant reprised the role for his U.S. stage debut, at BAM, in April 2016.

The Almeida Theatre, Islington, London, produced the play with Simon Russell Beale in the lead role in 2019.

See also 
 List of screen adaptations of Richard II

References

Bibliography

Editions of Richard II
 Bate, Jonathan and Rasmussen, Eric (eds.), Richard II (The RSC Shakespeare; London: Macmillan, 2010)
 Black, Matthew W. (ed.) The Tragedy of King Richard the Second (The Pelican Shakespeare; London, Penguin, 1957; revised edition 1970)
 Dawson, Anthony B. and Yachnin, Paul (eds.) Richard II (The Oxford Shakespeare; Oxford: Oxford University Press, 2012)
 Dolan, Frances E. (ed.) Richard II (The Pelican Shakespeare, 2nd edition; London, Penguin, 2000)
 Dover Wilson, John (ed.) Richard II (The New Shakespeare; Cambridge: Cambridge University Press, 1939; 2nd edition, 1951)
 Edmondson, Paul (ed.) Richard II (The New Penguin Shakespeare 2nd edition; London: Penguin, 2008)
 Evans, G. Blakemore (ed.) The Riverside Shakespeare (Boston: Houghton Mifflin, 1974; 2nd edn., 1997)
 
 Greenblatt, Stephen; Cohen, Walter; Howard, Jean E. and Maus, Katharine Eisaman (eds.) The Norton Shakespeare: Based on the Oxford Shakespeare (London: Norton, 1997)
 Gurr, Andrew (ed.) King Richard II (The Cambridge Shakespeare; Cambridge: Cambridge University Press, 1984; 2nd edition 2003)
 Muir, Kenneth (ed.) Richard II (Signet Classic Shakespeare; New York: Signet, 1963; revised edition, 1988; 2nd revised edition 1999)
 Powell, Ivor B. (ed.) King Richard II (The Arden Shakespeare, 1st Series; London: Arden, 1912)
 Ure, Peter (ed.) King Richard II (The Arden Shakespeare, 2nd Series; London: Arden, 1956)
 Wells, Stanley (ed.) Richard II (The New Penguin Shakespeare; London: Penguin, 1969; revised edition 1997)
 Wells, Stanley; Taylor, Gary; Jowett, John and Montgomery, William (eds.) The Oxford Shakespeare: The Complete Works (Oxford: Oxford University Press, 1986; 2nd edn., 2005)
 Werstine, Paul and Mowat, Barbara A. (eds.) Richard II (Folger Shakespeare Library; Washington: Simon & Schuster, 1996)

Secondary sources
 Barroll, Leeds. "A New History for Shakespeare and His Time." Shakespeare Quarterly 39 (1988), 441–444.
 Bergeron, David. "The Deposition Scene in Richard II." Renaissance Papers 1974, 31–37.
 Bullough, Geoffrey. "Narrative and Dramatic Sources of Shakespeare". Early English History Plays: Henry VI Richard III Richard II, volume III, Routledge: London, New York, 1960.
 Huke, Ivan and Perkins, Derek. Richard II: Literature Revision Notes and Examples. Celtic Revision Aids. 1981. .
 Chambers, E. K. William Shakespeare: A Study of Facts and Problems. 2 Volumes. Oxford: Clarendon Press, 1930.
 Rose, Alexander. Kings in the North – The House of Percy in British History. Phoenix/Orion Books Ltd, 2002, 
 Smitd, Kristian. Unconformities in Shakespeare's History Plays, St. Martin's Press: New York, 1993.
 Tillyard, E. M. W. Shakespeare's History Plays, Chatto & Windus: London, 1944.

External links

 
 
 
 King Richard the Second – Modern version of the play

1595 plays
Shakespearean histories
English Renaissance plays
Cultural depictions of English monarchs
Plays set in England
Richard II of England
British plays adapted into films
Plays about English royalty
Plays set in the 14th century